The Wadi Mejenin Dam is an embankment dam located on Wadi Mejenin,  south of Tripoli in the Jabal al Gharbi District of Libya. Completed in 1972, the primary purpose of the dam is water supply for irrigation and flood control.

References

Mejenin
Jabal al Gharbi District
Dams completed in 1972
1972 establishments in Libya